Banksia formosa, commonly known as showy dryandra, is a species of shrub that is endemic to the south-west of Western Australia. It has pinnatipartite leaves with up to forty triangular lobes on each side, up to more than two hundred, conspicuous golden orange flowers and up to sixteen egg-shaped follicles in each head.

Description
Banksia formosa is an erect shrub that typically grows to a height of  but does not form a lignotuber. There are between thirty and forty-five more or less triangular lobes on each side of the leaves. The flowers are borne on a head containing between 100 and 220 flowers in each head. Each head may have up to thirteen follicles.

Taxonomy and naming
This species was first formally described in 1810 by Robert Brown who gave it the name Dryandra formosa and published the description in the Transactions of the Linnean Society of London.

In 2007, Austin Mast and Kevin Thiele transferred all the dryandras to the genus Banksia and this species became Banksia formosa. The specific epithet (formosa) is a Latin word meaning "beautiful on account of form".

Distribution and habitat
Banksia formosa grows in kwongan and open forest between Busselton and Two Peoples Bay Nature Reserve and is common near Albany and in the Stirling Range.

Ecology
An assessment of the potential impact of climate change on this species found that its range is likely to contract by between 50% and 80% by 2080, depending on the severity of the change.

References

 

formosa
Taxa named by Kevin Thiele